Ukraine is a nation that has competed at the Hopman Cup tournament on four occasions, the first being in 1993. In 1995 and 2016, Ukraine were the tournament runners-up and this remains their best showing to date.

Before its dissolution, Ukraine used to form part of the Soviet Union which also competed at the Hopman Cup on two occasions in the early 1990s. Additionally, Ukraine is a member of the CIS which entered a CIS team into the 1992 event.

Players
This is a list of players who have played for Ukraine in the Hopman Cup.

Results

1 As Andrei Medvedev and Natalia Medvedeva had already lost both of their singles matches, the mixed doubles dead rubber was not played.
2 In the final against Germany, the mixed doubles dead rubber was not played as Andrei Medvedev and Natalia Medvedeva had already lost both of their singles matches.

References

See also
CIS at the Hopman Cup
Soviet Union at the Hopman Cup

Hopman Cup teams
Hopman Cup
Hopman Cup